Carol Lynley (born Carole Ann Jones; February 13, 1942 – September 3, 2019) was an American actress known for her roles in the films Blue Denim (1959) and The Poseidon Adventure (1972).

Lynley was born in Manhattan to an Irish father and New England mother. She began her career as a child model before taking up acting. She won the Theatre World Award as "one of the most promising personalities for 1956–57" for her performance in The Potting Shed. Lynley started her film career in 1958 with the Disney film The Light in the Forest, followed by Holiday for Lovers (1959) and Blue Denim (1959). In 1959, she was nominated for the Golden Globe Award for Most Promising Newcomer – Female for the film The Light in the Forest. A year later, she was again nominated for the Golden Globe Award for Most Promising Newcomer – Female for the film Blue Denim.

Early life 
Lynley was born Carole Ann Jones in Manhattan, New York City, the daughter of Frances (née Felch) and Cyril Jones. Her father was Irish and her mother, a native of New England, was of English, Scottish, Welsh, and German ancestry. She studied dance in her childhood. Lynley's parents divorced when she was a child, and her mother worked as a waitress until Lynley's income from modelling was enough to sustain the family.

Lynley had first appeared on a local television show and at the age of 14 she was signed as a child model. She then appeared on live TV shows, the Goodyear Television Playhouse, Alfred Hitchcock Presents and Danger Route.

She began her career as a child model under the name Carolyn Lee. She appeared on the April 22, 1957 cover of Life identified as "Carol Lynley, 15, Busy Career Girl" at age 15. When she started acting, she discovered that child actress Carolyn Lee (born Carolyn Copp, 1935) had already registered the name in the Actors' Equity union. She modified it by using the final syllable of Carolyn and fusing it with Lee to make Lynley.

In her teenage years, Lynley appeared in several Clairol and Pepsodent advertisements that were publicized across the country.

Career

Early career 
In 1955, Lynley made her first stage appearance in Moss Hart's Broadway stage hit Anniversary Waltz. At the age of 15, she played the role of Dame Sybil Thorndyke's granddaughter in the Broadway play The Potting Shed (1957).

Early on, Lynley distinguished herself on both the Broadway stage and in Hollywood screen versions of the controversial drama Blue Denim (1959), in which the teenaged characters played by Lynley and co-star Brandon deWilde had to deal with an unwanted pregnancy and (then-illegal) abortion. She won the Theatre World Award as "one of the most promising personalities for 1956–57" for her performance in Blue Denim. This recognition helped her get a seven-year contract with 20th Century Fox.

Film career 

Lynley started her film career in 1958 with the Disney film The Light in the Forest followed by Holiday for Lovers (1959). In 1959, she was nominated for the Golden Globe Award for Most Promising Newcomer – Female. In 1960, she was again nominated for the Golden Globe Award for Most Promising Newcomer – Female for the film Blue Denim.

She acted in 20th Century Fox productions Holiday for Lovers, Blue Denim, Hound-Dog Man (all in 1959), Return to Peyton Place (1961), and The Stripper (1963). The Stripper was based on the play A Loss of Roses written by William Inge.

Lynley appeared in many films, often portraying the blonde-girl-next-door gone bad. She is best known for her film roles in Return to Peyton Place (1961), the sex comedy Under the Yum Yum Tree (1963), the drama The Cardinal (1963), the romantic drama The Pleasure Seekers (1964), the thriller Bunny Lake Is Missing (1965), and The Poseidon Adventure (1972), in which she lip-synced the Oscar-winning song "The Morning After" (her singing voice was dubbed by studio singer Renee Armand).

The Hollywood Reporter reported that Lynley was on the peak of her career in the year 1965. She posed nude at age 22 for the March 1965 edition of Playboy magazine (pp. 108–115). She starred in the Otto Preminger directed thriller Bunny Lake Is Missing (1965). Lynley played Jean Harlow in the biopic Harlow (1965), co-starring Ginger Rogers, but the film failed at the box office.

The decline in her career started in the late 1960s. In 1967, Lynley had major roles in the horror The Shuttered Room and the British spy caper Danger Route, but the films were not successful. She did smaller roles, guest appearances and appeared in low-budget productions like Once You Kiss a Stranger (1969), The Maltese Bippy (1969), Norwood (1970), and the Larry Hagman directed horror spoof Son of the Blob (1972). However, she was unable to maintain her career momentum. She then appeared in The Four Deuces (1975), The Washington Affair (1977) and Bad Georgia Road (1977). In 1992, she acted in a low-budget thriller Spirits, as a nun. She acted in Flypaper (1997), followed by the low-budget film Drowning on Dry Land (1999). Many of the low-budget movies she acted in during the later part of her career were direct-to-video.

She appeared in the pilot television movies for Kolchak: The Night Stalker and Fantasy Island. Her many other series appearances include The Big Valley, Mannix, It Takes a Thief, Night Gallery, The Invaders, Kojak, Hawaii Five-O, Tales of the Unexpected, Hart to Hart, and Charlie's Angels. Lynley appeared in the fourth season of The Man from U.N.C.L.E. in the two-part episode "The Prince of Darkness Affair".

In 2000, in an interview with the San Francisco Chronicle, Lynley discussed the difficulty faced by middle-aged actresses in finding roles. She predicted she'd have a comeback in old age, stating, "I don't mean to sound conceited, but I am a very talented actress, and I have my head screwed on right." And she added "I'm not going to drug clinics, I look good, and I've got all my marbles. So I really believe I'll be back."

In 2006, she appeared in a 30-minute film, Vic, co-written and directed by Sage Stallone, the son of Sylvester Stallone.

Personal life and death 
In 1960, Lynley married publicist Michael Selsman. The marriage produced one child, Jill Selsman (a director of short films), and ended in divorce in 1964. She also had an 18-year intermittent affair with English broadcaster and writer David Frost.

Lynley died aged 77 of a heart attack on September 3, 2019, at her home in Pacific Palisades, California. She was cremated; her ashes were scattered at sea off the Southern California coast.

Selected filmography

Film

Television

References

External links 

 
 
 
 
 Carol Lynley (Aveleyman)

1942 births
2019 deaths
20th-century American actresses
21st-century American actresses
Actresses from New York City
American child actresses
American child models
American expatriates in the United Kingdom
American female models
American film actresses
American stage actresses
American television actresses
American people of Irish descent
American people of English descent
American people of Scottish descent
American people of Welsh descent
American people of German descent
People from Manhattan